Pelenakeke Brown is a multi-disciplinary New Zealand artist. In 2019 she was awarded the Disability Dance Artistry Award by Dance/NYC, and was recognised for her work through Creative NZ's Arts Pasifika Awards with the Pacific Toa award in 2020.

Career 
Brown was 9 years old when she became a founding member and company dancer for Touch Compass. Her involvement lasted from 1997 to 2000, when she left to focus on her schooling. After secondary school, Brown studied at the University of Auckland (2007–2010), completing a bachelor of arts in Pacific studies and English literature. In 2011, she undertook the Be Leadership programme with Be Lab, a New Zealand accessibility organisation. About the programme, Brown stated “Everyone has the potential to be a great leader and the Be.Leadership programme has helped me realize that I could be one too.”

After completing her undergraduate study and spending some time in the work force, Brown left New Zealand to continue studies in New York, moving in 2013 and studying at the National Academy School of Fine Arts completing the Studio Intensive Programme in 2016.

Brown's work is embedded in the Sāmoan concept Vā'.Vā centers spatial relationships as a way to understand and move in the world. In my art practice, this translates to interrogating relationships, how we relate to ourselves, each other. I am fascinated with the in-between spaces and how our in-between spaces inform the way we navigate the world. (Brown)Brown has exhibited work across the United States of America, in California, New York and San Francisco and in Germany, London, and New Zealand.  She has been published in the James Franco Review, Apogee Journal, Movement Research Performance Journal and the Hawai'i Review.

Brown spent six and a half years based in New York, where she engaged in choreography, movement, dance, curation, visual arts, writing, and storytelling. She has collaborated with The Metropolitan Museum of Art, New York Public Library, Goethe Institute and Gibney Dance Centre for projects. She has held art residencies in New York, Vermont and New Zealand. She returned to Auckland, New Zealand in mid-2019 and took up the role of artistic director at Touch Compass the following year, becoming the first disabled artist to lead the company in its twenty four years of operation.

In 2020, Brown collaborated with artist Yo Yo Lin and co-founded Rotations, "a dance collaborative movement working towards deepening and challenging our understanding of artistry, disability, and access".

Brown was the keynote speaker for the Ōtautahi Tiny Fest in 2021; writer Kosta Bogoievski described Brown's talk as '''an emotional opening, as festivals can be but Tiny Fest happens to be, in 2021, one of the last live performance festivals standing in the country'.In March 2022, Brown was part of an online panel discussion for Te Tairāwhiti Arts Festival wānanga series Te Ara i te Matihiko Toi'', to discuss access, inclusion and participation within the performing arts.

In 2022 Brown is one of the panel members evaluating proposals to the Innovation Fund at the New Zealand Ministry of Culture and Heritage. Other panel members are W. Gary Nicholas and Ian Barrs.

Performances

Solo Exhibitions

Group Exhibitions

Residencies

Scholarships and Awards

Personal life 
Brown has Sāmoan and Pālagi (non-Samoan) heritage.

References

External References 
Gender/Power Composition IV Performance https://vimeo.com/188065481

Pelenakeke Brown Movement Research at the Judson Church https://www.youtube.com/watch?v=ArMqVHODgcM&t=15s

Samoan women writers
Samoan women
Living people
New Zealand choreographers
Year of birth missing (living people)
New Zealand people of Samoan descent